Richard Ikeda (born 26 November 1974) is a Canadian gymnast. He competed at the 1996 Summer Olympics.

References

External links
 

1974 births
Living people
Canadian male artistic gymnasts
Olympic gymnasts of Canada
Gymnasts at the 1996 Summer Olympics
Sportspeople from Kamloops
Commonwealth Games medallists in gymnastics
Commonwealth Games gold medallists for Canada
Commonwealth Games silver medallists for Canada
Commonwealth Games bronze medallists for Canada
Pan American Games medalists in gymnastics
Pan American Games bronze medalists for Canada
Gymnasts at the 1995 Pan American Games
Gymnasts at the 1999 Pan American Games
Medalists at the 1995 Pan American Games
Gymnasts at the 1994 Commonwealth Games
20th-century Canadian people
21st-century Canadian people
Medallists at the 1994 Commonwealth Games